The men's 200 metre butterfly competition at the 2010 Pan Pacific Swimming Championships took place on August 18 at the William Woollett Jr. Aquatics Center.  The last champion was Michael Phelps of US. This was the first time in 3 years (since the 2007 World Aquatics Championships) that Phelps failed to beat a championship record in a final of international competition.

This race consisted of four lengths of the pool, all lengths being in butterfly stroke.

Records
Prior to this competition, the existing world and Pan Pacific records were as follows:

Results
All times are in minutes and seconds.

Heats
The first round was held on August 18, at 11:22.

B Final 
The B final was held on August 18, at 19:50.

A Final 
The A final was held on August 18, at 19:50.

References

2010 Pan Pacific Swimming Championships